The Hårsfjärden disaster was an event in the Swedish Navy during World War II. A series of accidental explosions, it caused by far the worst damage to Swedish Navy units during the era of that war, in which Sweden was not a combatant.

The disaster occurred on 17 September 1941.

The three destroyers were sunk, and thirty-three sailors killed, a major blow to the Swedish Navy. All three ships were later raised. Klas Uggla never again saw service; the other two ships did, after repairs.

An investigation into possible sabotage commenced. A theory emerged that the cause was a bomb dropped accidentally by a Swedish plane on training maneuvers, and other theories were advanced. But the cause was never established.

References

Further reading

Sweden in World War II
Naval history of Sweden
Ship fires
Explosions in 1941
Non-combat naval accidents
1941 in Sweden
Maritime incidents in September 1941